Hykes is an Anglo-Saxon surname, meaning ‘son of Haki’.

Notable people with the surname include:

David Hykes (born 1953), American musician
Julian Hykes, South African field hockey player